Big Wheel Recreation was an independent record label based in Boston, Massachusetts, United States. It was formed in the fall of 1994 by Rama Mayo and Dickie Cummings.  Started as a hobby, Big Wheel became a fully functioning record label in 1999.  The label took a hiatus from releasing records sometime in 2004 until September 23, 2015, when it released an audiobook version of Hyena by Jude Angelini.

Artists

454 Big Block
Aspera
At the Drive-In
Braid
The Cancer Conspiracy 
Cast Iron Hike
The Damn Personals
The Don't Tells
Fastbreak
Get High
The Hives
Hot Rod Circuit
In My Eyes
The (International) Noise Conspiracy
The Ivory Coast
Jebediah 
Jejune
Jimmy Eat World
Jude Angelini
Nathan Larson
Lazycain
Lovelight Shine 
No Knife
Piebald
The Pleased
River City High
Seafood
Six Going On Seven
Sunshine
Ten Yard Fight
Totally Travis

See also
 List of record labels

References

Record labels established in 1994
Record labels disestablished in 2004
American independent record labels
Indie rock record labels
Alternative rock record labels